Evelyn Araluen is an Australian poet and literary editor. She won the 2022 Stella Prize with her first book, Dropbear.

Career 
Araluen is a descendent of the Bundjalung people and was born on Dharug land.

Her poetry has been published in The Best Australian Poems 2016, Overland, Cordite Poetry Review and Southerly and other literary journals. She contributed a chapter, "Finding Ways Home", to Anita Heiss' Growing Up Aboriginal in Australia.

After being runner-up in the 2016 Nakata Brophy Prize for Young Indigenous Writers for her poem, "Learning Bundjalung on Tharawal", she won the following year for her short story, "Muyum: a transgression". In 2017 she also won first and third prizes in the Overland Judith Wright Poetry Prize for New and Emerging Poets for "Guarded by birds" and "Dropbear poetics".

In 2018 Araluen received one of the Wheeler Centre's inaugural Next Chapter grants, providing 12 months' mentoring by Tony Birch and a three-day writing retreat at Varuna, The Writers' House.

In 2019 she and Jonathan Dunk were appointed co-editors of Overland, an established Australian literary journal and in November that year were joint recipients of a Neilma Sidney Literary Travel Fund grant. She also won the inaugural Professional Development Award at the 2021 Melbourne Prize.

Her first book, Dropbear was published by the University of Queensland Press in March 2021. It won the 2022 Stella Prize and was highly commended in the 2021 Anne Elder Award. It was also shortlisted for the 2021 Judith Wright Calanthe Award, the 2022 Victorian Premier's Literary Award for Indigenous Writing and the 2022 Kenneth Slessor Prize for Poetry.

References 

Living people
Year of birth missing (living people)
21st-century Australian poets
21st-century Australian women writers
Australian editors
Australian women editors
Bundjalung people